Samir Subash Naik (born 8 August 1979) is an Indian former professional footballer who played as a defender for Dempo SC and India. He is currently the coach of Dempo SC in the Goa Professional League.

Playing career
Naik is part of successful Dempo SC squad which won 2 league titles and reached the semi final of the AFC Cup, he is also a regular for India. He also captained the Indian team in an international friendly against Oman in 2012.

Managerial career
Naik became the head coach of Dempo in 2019, and in the 2021–22 Goa Professional League season, the club end decade long wait, and clinched the title in style.

Honours

India
 AFC Challenge Cup: 2008
SAFF Championship: 2011; runner-up: 2008; third place: 2003
 Nehru Cup: 2009

India U23
 LG Cup: 2002

References

External links
 http://goal.com/en-india/people/india/21150/sameer-naik
 

1979 births
Living people
Indian footballers
Footballers from Mumbai
I-League players
India international footballers
India youth international footballers
Dempo SC players
Association football defenders
Footballers at the 2002 Asian Games
Asian Games competitors for India
Footballers from Goa